The Battle of Vasai or the Battle of Bassein was fought between the Marathas and the Portuguese rulers of Vasai (Portuguese, Baçaim; English, Bassein), a town lying near Mumbai (Bombay) in the Konkan region of present-day state of Maharashtra, India. The Marathas were led by Chimaji Appa, a brother of Peshwa Baji Rao I.

Background
The Provincia do Norte (Province of the North) region ruled by the Portuguese included not just the town of Baçaim but also areas far away as Bombay, Thana, Kalyan, Chaul and Revdanda. Baçaim is located about 50 kilometers north of Bombay, on the Arabian Sea. Baçaim, was an important trading center, and its sources of wealth was trade in horses, fish, salt, timber, basalt and granite, as well as shipbuilding. The town was a significant trading center long before the Portuguese arrived. Ancient Sopara was an important port that traded with the Arabs and Greeks, Romans and Persians. It was also a wealthy agricultural region with rice, betel nut, cotton, and sugar-cane widely grown.

In 1720, one of the ports of the Northern Province, Kalyan, was conquered by the Marathas and in 1737, they took possession of Thana including all the forts in Salsette island and the forts of Parsica, Trangipara, Saibana (Present-day Saivan, south bank of the Tansa river), Ilha das Vaccas (Island of Arnala), Manora (Manor), Sabajo (Sambayo/Shabaz near Belapur), the hills of Santa Cruz and Santa Maria. The only places in the Northern Province that now remained with the Portuguese were Chaul (Revdanda), Caranja, Bandra, Versova, Baçaim, Mahim, Quelme (Kelve/Mahim), Sirgão (Present day Shirgao), Dahanu Sao Gens (Sanjan), Asserim (Asheri/Asherigad), Tarapor (Tarapur) and Damão. By 1736, the Portuguese had been at work for 4 years constructing the fortress of Thana, and aside from the long delays, the workers were unpaid and unfed. The locals who were tired of the oppression, finally invited the Marathas to take possession of the island of Salsette, preferring their rule to the oppression of the Portuguese. These were some of the factors that weakened Baçaim and set the stage for Maratha attacks.

After the war of 1737- 39, Chimaji appa and his Maratha soldiers took the church bells from Vasai as memorabilia and installed them in various Hindu mandirs of Maharashtra, some of the bells they installed in Khandoba mandir, Tulja bhavani mandir of Jejuri and Osmanabad respectively . These church bells are still present in these mandirs. The garrison of Baçaim, thanks to the reinforcements received from Goa, was of about 1,200 soldiers, among Portuguese and Indian auxiliaries.

Siege of Baçaim
The siege of Baçaim began on 17 February 1739. All the Portuguese outposts around the major fort at Baçaim had been taken. Their supply routes from the north and south had been blocked, and with the English manning the seas, even that route was unreliable. Chimaji Appa arrived at Bhadrapur near Baçaim in February 1739. According to a Portuguese account, his forces numbered 40,000 infantry, 25,000 cavalry, and around 4,000 soldiers trained in laying mines. Furthermore, he had 5,000 camels and 50 elephants. More joined from Salsette in the following days, increasing the total Maratha troops amassed to take Baçaim to close to 100,000. The Portuguese, alarmed at this threat, decided to vacate Bandra, Versova and Dongri so as to better defend Baçaim. As per orders of the Portuguese Viceroy, the Count of Sandomil, only Baçaim, Damão, Diu and Karanja (Uran) were to be defended. These were duly fortified. In March 1739, Manaji Angre attacked Uran and captured it from the Portuguese. This was followed by easy Maratha victories at Bandra, Versova and Dharavi which the Portuguese garrison had vacated. Manaji Angre joined Chimaji Appa at Vasai after this. Thus by April 1739, the noose around Baçaim had further tightened.

The capture of Thana and Dharavi meant that even small boats could not reach Baçaim without being fired upon by Maratha cannons. Still, General Martinho De Silva decided to fight. Chimaji Appa now decided to bring down the fort of Baçaim itself. All except Vasai in Maratha hands, including the forts at Bandra, Versova, Dongri and Uran. The fort at Baçaim is situated on land with the Arabian sea on one side, and the Vasai creek on another two sides.

The village of Baçaim itself and the large Maratha camp at Bhadrapur were to the north. Within the fort itself, the towers of São Sebastião and Remedios faced the Marathas at Bhadrapur. The barracks and everything else was inside, with the main gate facing the Vasai creek. Chimaji Appa began the siege on 1 May 1739 by laying 10 mines next to the walls near the tower of Remedios. Maratha soldiers charged into the breach caused by exploding four of them. Almost immediately, they came under fire from Portuguese guns and muskets. Chimaji Appa, Malhar Rao Holkar, Ranoji Shinde and Manaji Angre goaded their contingents to scale the walls throughout the day. Next day on 2 May, the tower of São Sebastião and Remedios were repeatedly attacked. More mines were set off during the day, causing large breaches in the walls, between the two towers. Around 4,000 Maratha soldiers tried to pour into the fort, but the Portuguese opposition was fierce. They also managed to defend the two towers by lighting firewood. On 3 May, the tower of São Sebastião was demolished by a Maratha mine. Maratha armies could now easily march into the fort, without the fear of being fired upon from the tower. The encirclement and defeat of the Portuguese was complete. Chimaji Appa decided to settle the war at this point by sending an envoy to the Portuguese. In his letter, he warned them that the entire garrison would be slaughtered and the fort levelled if the war continued. The Portuguese commander in charge of the fort duly surrendered on 16 May 1739. The Maratha general ordered that the rest of the garrison leaved Baçaim with unfurled colours, muskets at the shoulder and playing drums, and that they were transported by sea to Mumbai (Bombay). On 23 May 1739, the saffron flag flew atop Baçaim.

See also
Portuguese India
First Anglo-Maratha War
Siege of Alorna
Siege of Tiracol
Novas Conquistas

References

Sources
 History of modern Deccan, 1720/1724-1948: Volume 1
 Footprint India

Vasai
Vasai
Conflicts in 1739
1739 in India
History of Vasai
18th century in Portuguese India
History of Thane district
1739 in the Portuguese Empire
1739 in Portuguese India

Invasions by India